Mesoleptos was a genus of mosasauroid from the Late Cretaceous period of Europe and the Middle East.

See also

 List of mosasaurs

External links
 Oceans of Kansas

Mosasaurs
Extinct animals of New Zealand
Mosasaurs of Asia
Mosasaurs of Europe